ipkg, or the Itsy Package Management System, is a discontinued lightweight package management system designed for embedded devices that resembles Debian's dpkg. It was used in the Unslung operating system for the Linksys NSLU2 (Optware), in OpenWrt, Openmoko, webOS, Gumstix, the iPAQ, QNAP NAS appliances and elsewhere; as of early 2017 it can still be used for the Synology NAS appliances and in the LuneOS operating system (although opkg is an increasingly common replacement).

As usual for package management systems, ipkg's  command-line utility allows installation of new packages, upgrading or removal of existing packages, querying package repositories for available packages, and listing already installed packages.

The development for this project has been discontinued. Many projects which formerly used ipkg have adopted the ipkg fork opkg as the replacement.

References

External links 
 
 

Free package management systems
Free software programmed in C
Linux package management-related software
Linux-only free software